The College of Letters and Science is the largest college within the University of California, Davis. It specializes in education in the fundamental liberal arts, mathematics, and sciences.

In 1959, UC Davis was designated a comprehensive general campus. The College of Letters and Science achieved independent status, becoming a full-fledged college in 1951. Composed of 14 majors and 70 faculty members, the college rapidly became a significant educational force. The UC Davis College of Letters and Science now has over 14,000 undergraduate students, 1,500 graduate students, 100,000 alumni, and 900 faculty, and offers more than 53 majors and 60 minors. The College of Letters and Science has over 55 departments and programs, 14 centers, labs, and museums, and received over 33 million dollars in research awards (2017–18).

U.S. News & World Report consistently gives top rating to the college's graduate programs. Graduate programs in economics 29th, fine arts 27th, history 32nd, English 20th, sociology 30th, psychology 26th, earth sciences 24th,  mathematics 34th, political science 17th, physics 28th, chemistry 32nd, computer science 37th, geology 17th, and statistics 31st.

References

External links 
 Website

Liberal arts colleges at universities in the United States
Letters and Science
1951 establishments in California